Esther is a female given name known from the Jewish queen Esther, eponymous heroine of the Book of Esther.

According to the Hebrew Bible, queen Esther was born with the name  Hadassah ("Myrtle"). Her name was changed to Esther to hide her identity upon becoming queen of Persia. The three letter root of Esther in Hebrew is s-t-r, "hide, conceal".

The name can be derived from the Old Persian stāra (NPer.  setāra, meaning "star") although some scholars identify Esther with the name of the Babylonian goddess of love Ishtar, given its association with the planet Venus (in its role as the Morning Star and the Evening star; see also the Star of Ishtar).

History of usage
Esther first occurs as a given name in Europe and the British Isles at the time of the Reformation prior to which the occurrence of Biblical names – unless borne by saints – was unusual. The modified form, Hester, has seemingly co-existed with the original Esther throughout the name's usage in the English-speaking world, where despite a theoretic slight difference in pronunciation, Esther and Hester were long largely – perhaps totally – interchangeable, with it being routine for a woman cited as Esther in one document to be elsewhere documented as Hester. One example of this is Esther Johnson, the "Stella" of Jonathan Swift, whose baptismal record identifies her as Hester but who always signed herself Esther. Similarly, Swift wrote letters to his "Vanessa": Esther Vanhomrigh, in which Swift sometimes wrote her first name in the respective address as Esther and sometimes as Hester.  The interchangeable usage of Esther and Hester had essentially been phased out by 1900, with Esther retaining a high usage (especially in North America), whereas the usage of Hester has shown a progressive decline.

The 9 September 1893 birth of Esther Cleveland, daughter of US president Grover Cleveland, was heavily publicized as the first birth of a presidential child in the White House; the press announcements of her name stated it meant "star". The 1891 birth of Cleveland's first daughter, also Biblically named Ruth, had caused a media sensation and boosted Ruth into the top ten of American girl's names, and while the public endorsement of Esther as the choice of name for Cleveland's second daughter was more muted, Esther did reach its all-time zenith of US popularity soon after Esther Cleveland's birth, being ranked as the #27 most popular name for American girls for the year 1896.

Esther has been a well-used name for Caucasian baby girls born in New York City, and has remained a favored name in some Jewish communities such as those in New York. It has also increased in usage along with other Biblical names for babies born during the COVID-19 pandemic by parents seeking comfort in their religious faith.

International variants
Alternate forms of Esther are:
Eistir (Irish)
Eseza (Luganda)
Esita (Luganda)
Essi (Finnish)
Essie (English)
Essy (Australian)
Esta (English)
Estée (French)
Ester (Catalan), (Czech), (Finnish), (Italian), (Portuguese), (North Germanic languages), (Spanish), (Persian)
Estera (Polish), (Slovak), (Romanian), (Lithuanian)
Estere (Latvian)
Esteri (Finnish)
Εσθήρ (Greek)
Eszter (Hungarian)
Eszti (Hungarian)
Ettie (English)
Etty (English)
Hester (English)
Hettie (English)
Inana (Sumerian)
 (ʾAstīr) Arabic
 (Esther), the Hebrew and Israeli version of the name. Also Esti and Eti.
 (Setare) (Persian)
 (Jestira) (Serbian)
 (Esfir) (Russian)
Esitere (Chichewa)

Esther

Esther Abrahams
Esther Aghatise
Esther Saville Allen
Esther Anderson
Esther E. Baldwin
Esther Baxter
Esther Béjarano
Esther Bell
Esther Benbassa
Esther de Berdt
Esther Blake
Esther Barbara Bloemart
Esther Boise van Deman
Esther Brand
Esther Brandeau
Esther Brann
Esther Brimmer
Esther Bubley
Esther Cailingold
Esther Cañadas
Esther Cardoso
Esther Clark Wright
Esther Clayson
Esther Cleveland
Esther Dankwah
Esther David
Esther Dean
Esther Delisle
Esther Duflo
Esther Dyson
Esther Earl, after whom Esther Day was named
Esther Edwards (disambiguation)
Esther Erlich
Esther Farbstein
Esther Fernández
Esther Ferrer
Esther Fischer-Homberger
Esther Forbes
Esther G. Frame
Esther Freud
Esther Friesner
Esther Geller
Esti Ginzburg
Esther Golar
Esther Goris
Esther Haase
Esther Hahn
Esther Hall
Esther Handali
Esther Hart (singer) (born 1970), Dutch singer
Esther Hart (Titanic survivor) (1863–1928), survivor of the sinking of the RMS Titanic
Esther Hasson
Esther Hautzig
Esther Hermitte
Esther Hicks
Esther Hobart Morris
Esther Studholme Hope
Esther Housh
Esther Howard
Esther Howland
Esther Hunt
Esther Inglis
Esther James
Esther John
Esther Johnson
Esther Jolobala
Esther Jones (disambiguation)
Esther Jungreis
Esther Kamatari
Esther Kellner
Esther Kenworthy Waterhouse

Esther Kia'aina
Esther Koplowitz
Esther Kreitman
Esther K. Richardson
Esther Ku
Esther Kwan
Esther Lachmann
Esther Lederberg
Esther Lekain
Esther Levine
Esther J. Trimble Lippincott
Esther Liu
Esther Marly Conwell
Esther Margolis
Esther Maria Lewis Chapin
Esther Martinez
Esther McCoy
Esther McCracken
Esther Mcheka Chilenje
Esther McVey
Esther Muir
Esther Murugi Mathenge
Esther Newberg
Esther Newton
Esther Nisenthal Krinitz
Esther Afua Ocloo
Esther Ofarim
Esther Orozco
Esther Ouwehand
Esther Oyema
Esther Peterson
Esther Phillips
Esther Pohl Lovejoy
Esther D. du Pont
Esther Tuttle Pritchard
Esther Pugh
Esther Rahim
Esther Ralston
Esther Rantzen
Esther Raziel Naor
Esther Rochon
Esther Rolle
Esther Rome
Esther Roper
Esther Rose
Esther Roth Shahamorov
Esther Sandoval
Esther Schipper, German art dealer
Esther Schweins
Esther Scott
Esther Shimazu
Esther Shiner
Esther Snyder
Esther Somerfeld-Ziskind
Esther Baker Steele
Esther Sumner Damon
Esther Szekeres-Klein
Esther W. Taylor 
Esther Termens
Esther Vanhomrigh
Esther Valiquette
Esther Vergeer
Esther Vilar
Esther Vilenska
Esther Walker
Esther Wanjiru
Esther Wertheimer
Esther Wheelwright
Esther Williams
Esther Wojcicki
Esther Wong
Esther Yu

Ester
 Ester Andujar
 Ester Aparecida dos Santos
 Ester Balassini
 Ester Blenda Nordström
 Ester Böserup
 Elisa Colberg, known as Ester Colberg
 Ester Fanous
 Ester Hernandez
 Ester Larsen
 Ester Ledecká
 Ester Mägi
 Ester Peony
 Ester H. Segal
 Ester Toivonen
 Ester Wier
 Ester Workel

See also
 Esther (disambiguation)
 Queen Esther (disambiguation)
 Esta (given name)
 Estelle (given name)
 Stella (given name)
 Eszter, a given name
 Etty, Etti, and Ettie, given names
 Hester, a given name and surname
 Hetty (disambiguation)

Notes

Feminine given names
Hebrew feminine given names
English feminine given names
Esther
Inanna